Lisa Kahn may mean:
Lisa B. Kahn, American economist
Lisa Kahn (poet) (1921–2013), German-American scholar and poet